Sean Patrick Hayes (born June 26, 1970) is an American actor, comedian, and producer. Known for his performances on stage and screen, he gained acclaim for his role as Jack McFarland on the NBC sitcom Will & Grace, for which he won a Primetime Emmy Award and four Screen Actors Guild Awards as well as nominations for six Golden Globe Awards.

He also runs a television production company called Hazy Mills Productions, which produces shows such as Grimm, Hot in Cleveland, The Soul Man, and Hollywood Game Night. He portrayed Jerry Lewis in the CBS movie Martin and Lewis (2002). He is known for his appearances in films such as Billy's Hollywood Screen Kiss (1998), Pieces of April (2003), The Cat in the Hat (2003), Win a Date with Tad Hamilton! (2004), The Bucket List (2007), and Am I OK? (2022). Since July 2020, he has co-hosted the comedy podcast SmartLess alongside Jason Bateman and Will Arnett.

Hayes made his Broadway debut playing Chuck Baxter in the musical Promises, Promises in 2010 and received a Tony Award for Best Performance by a Leading Actor in a Musical nomination. He portrayed God in the comedy An Act of God from 2015 to 2016 and Oscar Levant in the play Good Night Oscar in 2022. He hosted the 64th Tony Awards, for which he was awarded a Primetime Emmy Award for Outstanding Special Class Program.

Early life
Hayes was born in Evergreen Park, Illinois, the youngest child of five of Mary Hayes (1939-2018), the director of a non-profit food bank called the Northern Illinois Food Bank, and Ronald Hayes, a lithographer. He is of Irish descent and was raised as a Roman Catholic in the Chicago suburb of Glen Ellyn, Illinois. His father, an alcoholic, left the family when Hayes was five years old, leaving his mother to raise him and his siblings. He has been estranged from his father for many years.

After graduating from Glenbard West High School, Hayes attended Illinois State University, where he studied piano performance. He left "two or three classes short" of graduation when he became music director at the Pheasant Run Theater in St. Charles, Illinois.

Hayes worked as a classical pianist. He practiced improv at The Second City in Chicago. He also composed original music for a production of Antigone at the Steppenwolf Theatre Company in Chicago.

Career
As a teenager, Hayes was an extra in the film Lucas (1986), which was filmed at his high school. He made his professional debut in the independent film Billy's Hollywood Screen Kiss (1998), which brought him wide attention. The same year, he was cast as Jack McFarland, a flamboyantly gay and frequently unemployed actor, in the NBC comedy series Will & Grace. The show became a long-running hit and Hayes' performance earned him seven consecutive Emmy Award nominations as Outstanding Supporting Actor in a Comedy Series. He won the award for his first nomination. He was also nominated for six Golden Globe Awards for his performance.

Hayes also made film appearances in Cats & Dogs (2001), as Jerry Lewis in Martin and Lewis (2002), Wayne in Pieces of April (2003), The Cat in the Hat (2003), and Win a Date With Tad Hamilton! (2004). He was also the voice of Brain in the 2008 film Igor, and has guest-starred in television shows such as Scrubs and 30 Rock. In 2005, he was executive producer for Bravo's Situation: Comedy, a reality television series about sitcoms. He also executive produced The Sperm Donor and Stephen's Life, the two winning scripts that were chosen by NBC. He guest-starred in 2006 in the Adult Swim cameo-filled show Tom Goes to the Mayor (S2E15, "Bass Fest"). Hayes appeared as Thomas in the film The Bucket List (2007). On July 5, 2008, he made his New York stage debut as Mr. Applegate / Devil in New York City Center's Encores! production of Damn Yankees.

He also appeared as Mr. Hank Humberfloob and provided the voice of "The Fish" in The Cat in the Hat. In a 2008 interview in The New York Times, Hayes talked about a television project, BiCoastal, about "a guy with a wife and kids in California and a boyfriend in New York" for Showtime. He made his Broadway debut in the April 2010 Broadway revival of the musical Promises, Promises. He received a nomination for the Drama League Award for Distinguished Performance, and was nominated for a Tony Award for Best Actor in a Musical.

Hayes was host of the 64th Annual Tony Awards on June 13, 2010, on CBS. In 2010, he reprised the role of Mr. Tinkles, the evil white Persian cat, in Cats & Dogs: The Revenge of Kitty Galore. On November 15, 2010, he appeared in a satirical PSA for the repeal of Don't Ask, Don't Tell on The Daily Show with Jon Stewart. He played Larry Fine in the film The Three Stooges (2012).

Aware that his role in Will & Grace "wouldn't go on forever," Hayes teamed up with friend Todd Milliner, whom he met at Illinois State University, to create the television production company Hazy Mills Productions in 2004. Hayes was co-executive producer of the TV Land original comedy series Hot in Cleveland, which premiered in June 2010 and ran for six seasons. He was also a co-executive producer of the NBC series Grimm, as well as creator and executive producer on another NBC series, Hollywood Game Night. Other television series produced by the company include The Soul Man and Sean Saves the World.

Hayes and his husband, Scott Icenogle, produce lip-sync videos under their YouTube channel, The Kitchen Sync. They lip-synced to songs such as Trouble and Burnitup! He was the host of An All Star Tribute to James Burrows. Hayes starred in the Broadway production An Act of God, June 6 to September 4, 2016, after engagements in Los Angeles and San Francisco.

In 2017, Hayes played the role of Steven, the devil emoji in The Emoji Movie. He and his husband wrote a book named Plum, which is about how the sugar plum fairy got her wings. Hayes has always had an interest for the Nutcracker and memorized the whole musical piece. Hayes has also guest starred as Buddy Wood on the NBC sitcom Parks and Recreation.

In July 2020, Hayes, along with Will Arnett and Jason Bateman, created a comedy and talk podcast called SmartLess. He also hosts another podcast with Dr. Priyanka Wali called HypochondriActor. Hayes starred in and was one of the executive producers for the Netflix Series Q-Force, released September 2, 2021.

In 2022 Hayes portrayed pianist Oscar Levant in the play by Doug Wright entitled Good Night, Oscar which premiered at the Goodman Theatre in Chicago. He is set to reprise the role on Broadway at the Belasco Theatre.

Personal life
Hayes refused to discuss his sexual orientation for many years, saying he believed that audiences would therefore be more open-minded about his characters. In a 2010 interview with The Advocate, he appeared to imply that he is gay, stating: "Really? You're gonna shoot the gay guy down? I never have had a problem saying who I am. I am who I am." He also indicated that he was in a relationship. He feels he has "contributed monumentally to the success of the gay movement in America, and if anyone wants to argue that, I'm open to it."

He received an honorary PhD from Illinois State University in February 2013.

In November 2014, Hayes announced that he had married his partner of eight years, Scott Icenogle.

In October 2017, while appearing on an episode of The Ellen DeGeneres Show, Hayes revealed that he had been hospitalized with a rare condition in which his small intestine burst. The intestine was successfully repaired.

Filmography

Film

Television

Theatre

Awards and nominations

References

Further reading
 Sean Hayes. Biography Resource Center Online. Gale Group. 1999.

External links

 
 M

1970 births
20th-century American male actors
21st-century American male actors
Living people
American male comedians
American male film actors
American male musical theatre actors
American male television actors
American male voice actors
American people of Irish descent
Television producers from Illinois
Comedians from Illinois
American gay actors
Illinois State University alumni
Gay comedians
LGBT television producers
LGBT people from Illinois
Male actors from Chicago
Outstanding Performance by a Supporting Actor in a Comedy Series Primetime Emmy Award winners
Outstanding Performance by a Male Actor in a Comedy Series Screen Actors Guild Award winners
People from Glen Ellyn, Illinois
20th-century American comedians
21st-century American comedians
American podcasters
American LGBT comedians